National Geographic Adventure was a magazine started in 1999 by the National Geographic Society in the United States. The first issue was published in Spring 1999. Regular publication of the magazine ended in December 2009, and the name was reused for a biannual newsstand publication. The last issue was December 2009/January 2010.

Features
The magazine covered adventure travel, environmental issues, natural science, and other topics related to the outdoors. It focused on adventure travel and included:

Regular features 
"First In", that featured recent adventure travel news
"Gear", that featured experts' recommendations of good gear that would improve ones' vacation experience
"Living It" that featured Adventure tips, ways to avoid danger, ways to help, etc.
"Next Weekend", that featured good weekend trips from all across the U.S.
"Where Next", that featured vacation destinations across the world

Adventurer of the Year
Annually, a slate of adventurers were named National Geographic Adventure Adventurer of the Year", in a variety of categories. For example, the December 2008/January 2009 issue named "Fourteen people who dreamed big, pushed their limits, and made our year". One, Pemba Gyalje Sherpa, was named for "extreme heroism under trying extreme circumstances" for repeatedly risking his life to successfully rescue several mountaineers stranded on the mountain, during the 2008 K2 disaster.

Masthead
John Rasmus served as the editor-in-chief of the magazine from its inception to its closure.
Sam Serebin and Tom Bentkowski were the design team responsible for the initial prototype and first six issues of the magazine.

References

External links
 Official National Geographic Adventure website

Defunct magazines published in the United States
Environmental magazines
Hobby magazines published in the United States
Magazines established in 1999
Magazines disestablished in 2009
Magazines published in Washington, D.C.
National Geographic Society magazines
Science and technology magazines published in the United States
1999 establishments in the United States